Pol-e Sefid (also Romanized as Pol-e Sefīd and Pol Sefid, literately White Bridge) is center of Savadkuh County and city in the Central District of Savadkuh County, Mazandaran Province, Iran.  At the 2016 census, its population was 8,794, in 2,163 families.

References

Populated places in Savadkuh County

Cities in Mazandaran Province